The Kaiwaikawe Wind Farm is a proposed wind farm to be located in the Northland Region of New Zealand. It is expected to have a maximum capacity of 73MW and use up to 19 turbines. The wind farm will be developed by Tilt Renewables.

Tilt applied for resource consent for the wind farm - then called Omamari - in May 2021. In July 2021 Tilt signed a 20-year agreement with Genesis Energy Limited to sell the electricity from the wind-farm, which had been renamed Kaiwaikawe.

The project was granted resource consent in March 2022.

Location
The wind farm will be about 10 kilometres north-west of Dargaville.

See also

Wind power in New Zealand

References

Proposed wind farms in New Zealand
Buildings and structures in the Northland Region